Devin Marquese Bush Jr. (born July 18, 1998) is an American football inside linebacker for the Seattle Seahawks of the National Football League (NFL). He played college football at Michigan.

Early years
Bush was born in 1998. He is the son of Devin Bush, who played at the safety position in the National Football League from 1995 to 2002. Bush grew up in Pembroke Pines, Florida, where he attended Charles W. Flanagan High School and played high school football.

College career

Recruiting and 2016 season
In December 2015, Bush rejected a scholarship offer from Florida State, where his father played, and committed instead to play college football for the Michigan Wolverines football team. In February 2016, Michigan hired Bush's father as a defensive analyst for the football coaching staff.

Bush enrolled at the University of Michigan in the fall of 2016. He appeared in all 13 games as a freshman for the 2016 Michigan Wolverines football team. He earned a reputation as the hardest hitting player on the Michigan team.

In April 2017, Bush impressed observers in the spring game.

2017 season

Bush won the starting job at inside linebacker on the 2017 Michigan team.

In the season opener against Florida, he posted a team-high seven tackles, including three tackles for loss and two sacks.

Two weeks later, he had a career-high 12 tackles against Air Force on September 16, 2017. Through the first three games of the season, he led the Big Ten Conference with four sacks and five tackles for loss.

After Michigan defeated Purdue on September 23, Nick Baumgardner of the Detroit Free Press credited Bush with 13 "impact plays" in the game, rated him the best player on Michigan's defensive unit, and called him "more or less, a one-man wrecking crew."

During the 2017 season, Bush was tied for seventh in the conference with 94 stops, including 35 solo tackles. His 9.5 tackles for loss include 5.0 sacks. Following the 2017 season, Bush was named to the All-Big Ten defensive first-team by the coaches, and second-team by the media. He was also named a Second-team All-American by Walter Camp Football Foundation.

2018 season
Prior to the 2018 season, Bush was voted captain of the Wolverines by his teammates.  Bush was also named an AP preseason first-team All-American.  During the opening game against Notre Dame where he had 1.5 sacks, Bush left the game during the second quarter and was evaluated for cramps.

On October 20, prior to playing against Michigan State Spartans after MSU players attempted to engage in their pre-game ritual late and through Michigan players,   Bush defaced the Spartan logo at midfield. During the 2018 season, Bush was the team's leading tackler with 80 stops, and he ranked second on the team in tackles for loss (9.5) and sacks (5.0). Following the season, he was named Nagurski–Woodson Defensive Player of the Year, Butkus–Fitzgerald Linebacker of the Year and was named to the All-Big Ten defensive first-team by both the coaches and media. He was also named a consensus All-American. On December 19, 2018, Bush announced that he would forgo his senior season to declare for the 2019 NFL Draft; also, that he would not play in Michigan's bowl game, the Peach Bowl.

College statistics

Professional career

Pittsburgh Steelers
The Pittsburgh Steelers selected Bush in the first round (10th overall) of the 2019 NFL Draft. His father, Devin Bush, was also a first round (26th overall) pick in the 1995 NFL Draft.
The Steelers traded their first round (20th) and second round (52nd overall) picks in the 2019 NFL Draft and a third round pick (83rd overall) in the 2020 NFL Draft to Denver Broncos in exchange for the tenth overall pick which was used in order to draft Bush.

2019
On May 12, 2019, the Pittsburgh Steelers signed Bush to a fully guaranteed four-year, $18.87 million contract that includes a signing bonus of $11.74 million.

Bush made his NFL debut in Week 1 against the New England Patriots.  In the game, Bush made 11 tackles in the 33–3 loss. In Week 3 against the San Francisco 49ers, Bush recorded a team high 11 tackles and recovered a fumble forced by safety Minkah Fitzpatrick in the 24–20 loss. In Week 4 against the Cincinnati Bengals, Bush recorded nine tackles and made his first career sack on Andy Dalton in the 27–3 win. In Week 5 against the Baltimore Ravens, Bush recorded his first career interception off Lamar Jackson in the 26–23 loss.
In Week 6 against the Los Angeles Chargers, Bush made a team high seven tackles, recovered a fumble lost by Philip Rivers which he returned for a touchdown, and recorded an interception off Rivers in the 24–17 win. Bush became the first rookie to record a fumble return for a touchdown and an interception in the same game since Chicago Bears' safety Eddie Jackson accomplished this feat in 2017.  He was named the AFC Defensive Player of the Week for his performance. In Week 12 against the Cincinnati Bengals, Bush recorded four tackles and forced a fumble on wide receiver Tyler Boyd which was recovered by Minkah Fitzpatrick in the 16–10 win. In Week 17 against the Baltimore Ravens, Bush recorded a team high 12 tackles during the 28–10 loss. During the game, Bush surpassed 100 tackles on the season.

2020
Bush started the first 5 games of the 2020 season, playing every defensive snap, recording 26 total tackles as well as 16 solo tackles and a sack. Bush suffered a torn ACL in the second quarter of the week 6 game against the Cleveland Browns, and was placed on injured reserve on October 23, 2020.

2022
The Steelers declined the fifth-year option on Bush's contract on May 2, 2022, making him a free agent after the season. He played in 17 games with 14 starts, recording 81 tackles.

Seattle Seahawks
On March 16, 2023, the Seattle Seahawks signed Bush to a one-year contract.

NFL career statistics

Regular season

References

External links
  Sports Reference (College)
 Pittsburgh Steelers bio
 Michigan Wolverines bio
 

1998 births
Living people
Players of American football from Florida
Sportspeople from Pembroke Pines, Florida
All-American college football players
American football linebackers
Michigan Wolverines football players
Pittsburgh Steelers players
Ed Block Courage Award recipients
Seattle Seahawks players